Bogong may refer to:
Bogong moth, a large Australian moth species
Bogong, Victoria, a locality in Victoria, Australia
Bogong High Plains, a region of Victoria, Australia
County of Bogong, one of the 37 counties of Victoria, Australia
Mount Bogong, a mountain in the region of Victoria, Australia
 Bogong, New South Wales a parish in the Snowy Mountains